Litoral (meaning "Coastal [Province]") is the most populous province of Equatorial Guinea, recording a population of 367,348 in the 2015 national census. Its capital is Bata; the other two cities are Mbini and Kogo.

Litoral's western border is the Gulf of Guinea coast. It is the only coastal province of Río Muni. On land, it borders the following country subdivisions:
South Province, Cameroon—north
Centro Sur, Equatorial Guinea—east
Estuaire Province, Gabon—south

References

 
Provinces of Equatorial Guinea